Mount Rhone is the highest peak in the Bucknell Ridge in the northeast part of the Britannia Range. Named by the Advisory Committee on Antarctic Names (US-ACAN) after Christopher M. Rhone, a communications officer with the U.S. Naval Support Force, Antarctica, 1992–94; Director of Information Systems with the ASA, 1994–2000.
 

Mountains of Oates Land